McIntosh Laboratory is an American manufacturer of handcrafted high-end audio equipment based in Binghamton, New York. The company was founded in 1949 by Frank McIntosh. The company designs and produces audio amplifiers, stereo tuners and other consumer electronics products.

Company history
Frank H. McIntosh began his career with ten years at Bell Telephone Laboratories in Murray Hill, New Jersey. He then became a broadcast sales representative for the Graybar Corporation on the West Coast. During WWII he was head of the radio and radar division of the War Productions Board.

Early in 1942 Mr. McIntosh had a small consulting business in the Washington DC area designing radio stations and sound systems. He was affiliated with a Muzak franchise, Dr. Frank Stanton, President of CBS and Leonard Reinsch, Radio Advisor for Harry Truman. His business required high-power, low-distortion audio amplifiers, but none of those available could meet his requirements. In fact, most amplifiers failed to meet their published specifications. Being a perfectionist by nature he had an idea to develop a new amplifier that would have outstanding performance characteristics, high power and, when measured, meet advertised claims.

In 1946 Gordon Gow was hired as an engineering assistant to help develop his idea. The necessary materials to build the 'Unity Coupled transformer were just becoming available at that time. By 1948, the component parts of the Unity Coupled circuit were assembled into a symmetrically driven balanced output stage. Applications were filed for five basic patents. The first one was granted in 1949.

The amplifier was called the McIntosh 50W1 Amplifier. Although amplifiers like those designed in 1936 by Jefferson Electric could produce 60 watts of output power from a pair of 6L6 tubes, the 50-watt McIntosh amplifier enhanced performance with a wider bandwidth of 20 Hz to 20,000Hz and lower distortion of less than 1%. An article was published in the December 1949 issue of Audio magazine (then called Audio Engineering) by Frank H. McIntosh and Gordon J. Gow titled "Description and analysis of a New 50-Watt Amplifier Circuit". The Unity Coupled transformer was shown on the cover.

In April 1951, McIntosh Engineering Labs, Inc. moved from 910 King Street in Silver Spring, Maryland to 320 Water Street in downtown Binghamton, New York. The name was changed to McIntosh Laboratory, Inc. In 1956, the company moved to its current location of 2 Chambers Street, Binghamton, New York.

Dave O'Brien joined McIntosh in 1962.  He led the McIntosh Amplifier Clinics for the next 30 years.

McIntosh created a Loudspeaker division in 1967.

McIntosh amplifiers were used at the Woodstock Music Festival in 1969.  The Grateful Dead's "Wall of Sound" reputedly used forty-eight 300-watt per channel McIntosh model MC2300 solid state amplifiers for a total of 28,800 watts of continuous power.

In October 1977, Gordon Gow became president and CEO when Mr. McIntosh retired. Mr. McIntosh sold his stock shares to top management and a few dedicated McIntosh investors. He was retained with a salary on a consulting basis. He moved from his home in Endicott, NY to Scottsdale, Arizona

In 1982 Steve Jobs — a noted audiophile — wrote an impassioned letter to Gordon Gow, saying, “We have become very attached to the name Macintosh. Much like one’s own child, our product has developed a very definite personality.”  Gow agreed and McIntosh entered into a license agreement with the Apple Computer Company for 10 years and allowed Apple to use the Macintosh name.  The following statement appeared on the label on the back of the Macintosh Plus 1Mb computer.

Japanese years

The company was purchased by Japanese car audio maker Clarion in 1990. McIntosh components, particularly the early tube models, are highly regarded in Japan. In a speech shortly after the purchase, Clarion president Yutaka Oyamada told McIntosh employees that "we like McIntosh as it is, and we have no intention of changing what has made it so successful." Since the Clarion purchase, McIntosh has expanded into car audio and home theater.

In May 2003, Clarion sold McIntosh Laboratory to D&M Holdings, also of Japan. The company continues to operate independent engineering, design, and divisions.

Italian years and Return to the United States
On October 8, 2012, Fine Sounds SpA of Milan, Italy, announced it had purchased McIntosh.  In May 2014, the CEO of Fine Sounds Group, along with the President of McIntosh Labs, led a management buyout of the Fine Sounds Group from its Italian investment firm owner, Quadrivio Investment Group.

Since then, Fine Sounds group has renamed itself McIntosh Group and relocated from Milan to New York.

Products

More notable products
Early 1970s: MC 2300 Power Amplifier, 300 WPC.

Early 1980s: MC 2500 Power Amplifier, 500 WPC Power Guard and similar chassis to MC 2300.

Around 1990: MC 2600 Power Amplifier, 600 WPC Power Guard final version on MC 2300 Chassis.

Around 1990: MC 7300, 300 WPC and much smaller than MC 2300.

Around 2010: MT10 Precision Turntable.

Around 2017: MC1.25KW, 1200 WPC Quad balanced Amp.

Around 2020: MA12000, 350 WPC Hybrid Tube/SS Integrated Amp

Competition
In the all-tube receiver-amplifier 1970s, competition in audio products for McIntosh came from Fisher, H H Scott, Marantz, and Harman Kardon. For the present day historical audio collector, McIntosh is the most valued when measured by marketplace prices.

Car audio
While car audio is no longer included in their current catalog, models once available include a CD changer, CD changer/AM/FM controller, and an external DAC.

Unique features such as the Fast Responding Wattmeter and the patented Power Guard circuitry set their amplifiers apart from others' products;  various models were available offering from 75 to 2,000 watts, divided amongst one to six channels. High quality power supplies, powerful circuit topologies, and balanced inputs completed each amplifier.

At the end of the chain used to lie their hand-built drivers, which came in standard -inch and -inch nominal sizes. All applicable car products were finished with McIntosh's signature glass plate displays.

A few vehicles were available from the factory with McIntosh sound systems, including Subaru Legacy and Outback models (starting from the BH & BE Legacy chassis) and the 2005–2006 Ford GT.

On September 3, 2020 McIntosh’s first ever automotive Reference system was recently announced by Jeep with its return to American luxury SUVs with the Grand Wagoneer concept.

References

External links

Official website
McIntosh Resource @ The High Fidelity Museum
Publications by High End Audio Magazine 
German language product announcements
First-Hand Company History by longtime employee

Audio amplifier manufacturers
Binghamton, New York
Compact Disc player manufacturers
Audio equipment manufacturers of the United States
Loudspeaker manufacturers
Manufacturing companies based in New York (state)
Companies based in Binghamton, New York